KRQE (channel 13) is a television station in Albuquerque, New Mexico, United States, affiliated with CBS and Fox. Owned by Nexstar Media Group, it is sister to Santa Fe–licensed de facto CW owned-and-operated station KWBQ (channel 19) and MyNetworkTV affiliate KASY-TV (channel 50) (both owned by Mission Broadcasting with certain services provided by Nexstar through a shared services agreement [SSA]). The stations share studios on Broadcast Plaza in Albuquerque, while KRQE's transmitter is located on Sandia Crest, east of Albuquerque.

History
Channel 13 began operation in October 1953 as KGGM-TV, owned by the Hebenstreit family's New Mexico Broadcasting Company along with KGGM radio (610 AM, now KNML). In the late 1960s, the Hebenstreits sold a minority share to Chicago's Harriscope Broadcasting, which at one point owned WSNS-TV in Chicago (among other stations). Many early Westerns were filmed, at least partially, at KGGM. The large studio that it used was renovated in 2000 into KRQE's "Newsplex", a combination newsroom and news studio.

KGGM talent Earnest "Stretch" Scherer, known as Captain Billy, came over to the station from KOB in the mid-1950s; he hosted a children's show called Captain Billy's Clubhouse. The format was a kids' peanut gallery on bleachers holding about 50 seats with games and banter between cartoons, à la Bozo's Circus. Captain Billy was a sea captain with a Dutch boy white haircut sticking out from under a sea Captain's hat and big brush moustache.

On October 26, 1972, Scherer was shot in the station's lobby by the husband of a volunteer for the local cut-ins of the Jerry Lewis MDA Telethon, who had perceived Scherer wrapping an arm around the woman as a flirting attempt which angered the husband. He died of his injuries on December 18, and the man was committed to the New Mexico Behavioral Health Institute in Las Vegas, New Mexico as he was diagnosed with post-traumatic stress disorder caused from his World War II service. He escaped and fled to Arizona, remaining there until his death in 1991 as extradition to New Mexico was refused by those authorities.

Among many alumni at KGGM/KRQE is Ray Rayner, formerly a children's television personality at WGN-TV in Chicago; he "retired" to Albuquerque in 1980 and became the weather presenter for KGGM-TV's newscasts for five years in the early 1980s.

After having sold off KGGM radio in 1973, the Hebenstreits sold 42 percent of KGGM-TV to Lee Enterprises in 1985. The New Mexico Broadcasting Company acquired semi-satellite KBIM-TV (channel 10) in Roswell, which had until that time operated independently as a CBS affiliate, for $5 million in 1989. The purchase created financial strains on the Hebenstreits, who opted to sell their remaining shares to Lee in 1991. Citing the station's perceived reputation as a perennial third-place news outlet, Lee changed the call letters—at Andrew Hebenstreit's suggestion—to KRQE on September 7, 1992. However, the name "New Mexico Broadcasting Company" continued on the station's license well into the 21st century.

In January 1995, KRQE became a secondary affiliate of both UPN and The WB, running their programming on weekend overnights. Both networks moved to KASY-TV (channel 50) when it signed on that October, with KRQE running KASY under a local marketing agreement (LMA) with Ramar Communications. Ramar sold KASY to ACME Communications, owner of KWBQ, in 1999, and the LMA with KRQE was dissolved.

Lee would eventually exit broadcasting and sold KRQE, along with most of the rest of its group, to Emmis Communications in 2000. In 2005, Emmis, in its own exit from television, sold the station to LIN TV Corporation in a group deal that included sister stations WLUK-TV in Green Bay, WALA-TV and WBPG in Mobile–Pensacola, and WTHI-TV in Terre Haute. In 2006, LIN announced its purchase of Raycom Media-owned Fox affiliate KASA-TV, which KRQE took control of on September 15. LIN's acquisition of KASA was finalized on February 22, 2007. The acquisition earned LIN TV criticism from area newspapers for the resulting layoffs, as well as what the Albuquerque Objectivist newspaper in October 2006 referred to as the creation of a local "news empire" in KRQE.

KBIM-TV in Roswell signed on in February 1966 as the CBS affiliate for Southeastern New Mexico, replacing former CBS affiliate KAVE-TV in Carlsbad, New Mexico, which became an ABC affiliate (eventually becoming KOCT, a satellite of rival KOAT-TV). KBIM became a KGGM/KRQE satellite in 1990. KREZ-TV (channel 6) in Durango, Colorado began operations September 15, 1963, as KJFL-TV, a free-standing local independent station owned by Jeter Telecasting; it went off the air after its facilities were destroyed in a February 1964 fire, and the station was sold, rebuilt and returned to the air on September 9, 1965, as KREZ-TV, a satellite of CBS affiliate KREX-TV (channel 5) in Grand Junction, Colorado. KREZ operated as such for nearly 30 years (with many attempts at regional news along the way) before becoming a KRQE satellite in 1995. A deal to sell KREZ to Native American Broadcasting, LLC was reached in April 2011; upon the sale's completion, KREZ was to become a full-scale independent station (with plans for extensive local programming), and change its call letters to KSWZ-TV. However, the sale has not been completed, and KREZ remains a KRQE satellite.

Following the acquisitions of KBIM and KREZ, in the late 1990s, KRQE branded as "CBS Southwest" in hopes of positioning itself as a regional network. However, this went nowhere, largely because the other stations in the market have long branded themselves by their call letters (even after acquiring or starting their own satellite stations), and in 2000 the station changed its branding to "KRQE News 13."

On May 18, 2007, LIN TV announced that it was exploring strategic alternatives that could have resulted in the sale of the company.

On August 7, 2009, KRQE began offering Mobile TV using BlackBerry.

On March 21, 2014, it was announced that Media General would acquire LIN. The merger was completed on December 19. Just over a year later, on January 27, 2016, it was announced that the Nexstar Broadcasting Group would buy Media General for $4.6 billion. After selling KASA to Ramar Communications, KRQE became part of "Nexstar Media Group." The sale was completed on January 17, 2017.

KRQE-DT2 (Fox New Mexico)
KRQE-DT2, branded on-air as Fox New Mexico, is the Fox-affiliated second digital subchannel of KRQE, broadcasting in 720p high definition on channel 13.2.

On January 18, 2017, KRQE-DT2 took over the Fox network affiliation for the Albuquerque market. The subchannel's programming was transferred from Santa Fe-licensed KASA-TV (channel 2), which had been the market's Fox affiliate from 1993 until 2017; KASA, in turn, inherited the Fox affiliation from KGSW-TV (channel 14, now occupied by KTFQ-DT) after that station's owner, the Providence Journal Company), bought the channel 2 license in 1993 (KGSW had been affiliated with Fox since the network's launch in 1986). KASA was sold to Ramar Communications, which changed the station into a Telemundo affiliate.

With the move, KRQE became the largest station by market size to have a subchannel-only Fox affiliation and the largest by market size to have a dual affiliation with two of the "Big Four" networks. KRQE held this position for nearly four years until January 7, 2021, when Sinclair Broadcast Group moved the intellectual property of Sinclair-controlled WTTE in Columbus, Ohio to a digital subchannel of ABC affiliate WSYX (which Sinclair owns outright) as part of the Columbus market's adoption of ATSC 3.0.

Programming

Syndicated programming
As of September 2020, syndicated programs broadcast on KRQE include The Drew Barrymore Show, Dr. Phil, Wheel of Fortune, and Jeopardy!, which are all distributed by CBS Media Ventures.

Syndicated programming on KRQE-DT2 includes The Doctors, TMZ, Family Feud, The People's Court, Hot Bench, Extra and Judge Mathis.

Sports programming
The dual affiliation makes KRQE one of a handful of stations in the United States to carry National Football League coverage from both CBS Sports and Fox Sports, along with other properties each hold rights to such as the World Series and NCAA March Madness.

News operation
Ordinarily, KRQE produces eight hours of local news on weekdays and four hours each weekend day that airs between KRQE and Fox New Mexico, for a total of 48 hours a week. In regards to the number of hours devoted to news programming, it is the highest local newscast output among all broadcast television stations in the Albuquerque market (as well as the state of New Mexico) combining the main KRQE channel and Fox New Mexico. The station and its newscasts identify themselves as "KRQE News 13".

According to Nielsen Media Research, the station was long a distant third in the market in terms of local viewership from the 1970s through the 2000s. This was largely because its competitors, KOB-TV and KOAT-TV, were two of their networks' strongest affiliates. In contrast, most CBS affiliates serving large stretches of territory either dominate their markets or are solid runners-up. The station has experienced a resurgence in recent years, however, and now wages a spirited three-way battle for the top spot in the market with KOAT and KOB. Since September 15, 2006, KRQE also produces an hour-long, 9 p.m. newscast for Fox New Mexico on 13.2. Fox New Mexico also airs a 10:35 p.m. newscast.

KBIM-TV offered local newscasts at 5:30 p.m. and 10 p.m. on Monday thru Fridays. However, due to budget cuts, the newscasts were canceled in December 2008; KBIM was southeast New Mexico's only source of local news with local news offices in Roswell, Carlsbad and Hobbs for many years. KREZ-TV's local newscasts from Durango were canceled several years earlier by KRQE, also due to budget cuts by the parent company, a move that also eliminated a primary local news source for the Four Corners Region.

On August 8, 2010, KRQE became the first and only station in New Mexico to broadcast their newscasts in true high definition (KRQE newscasts on Fox New Mexico are also in high definition). A new set and new graphics debuted on the first HD broadcast, and KRQE also switched to "The CBS Enforcer Music Collection" theme music package for the HD debut. In 2016, the station dropped "The Enforcer" package in favor of "Locals Only" by Stephen Arnold Music.

On October 24, 2018, KRQE debuted a new state of the art digital set, and also updated its logo, including a CBS logo at the bottom of their current logo.

Newscasts on Fox New Mexico
Debuting on September 16, 2006, Fox New Mexico (then on KASA) airs a one-hour nightly newscast produced by the main KRQE studios. Originally titled News 13 on Fox 2, the newscast was renamed KRQE News 13 at 9 on August 8, 2010, the same evening KRQE began broadcasting all newscasts in true high definition. During Fox New Mexico newscasts, and in cases of breaking news, Fox New Mexico carries Fox News coverage, as it is the Fox affiliate, rather than the CBS News coverage used by KRQE 13.1, the CBS affiliate. Prior to September 16, 2006, KOB-TV produced the newscast, titled Fox 2 News at Nine, for five years.

Since 2015, Fox New Mexico has featured a morning news program simulcast with KRQE 13.1 from 4:30 to 7 a.m. and airs local news from 7 to 9 a.m. when KRQE 13.1 airs CBS Mornings.

Currently, Fox New Mexico airs seven hours of local news each weekday, including 4½ hours in the morning (4:30–9 a.m.), a one-hour 6 p.m. newscast, another hour at 9 p.m., and a 10:35 p.m. broadcast.

New Mexico Living
Since late 2010, Fox New Mexico (then on KASA) has produced the local lifestyle program originally titled New Mexico Style hosted by Nikki Stanzione. In 2014, the show was renamed 2 KASA Style and was hosted by Chad Brummett and Brittany Flowers. In fall 2016, the show was renamed New Mexico Living and added Carmelina Hart as a co-host. After her departure in 2017, Kristen Currie became co-host before her departure in July 2019. Alexa Romero was named permanent co-host with Brummett in August 2019. Airing from 9 to 10 a.m., it covers topics such as food, fashion and local entertainment, along with weather and breaking news. (The show immediately re-airs at 10 a.m. on KWBQ.)

Technical information

Subchannels

The station's digital signal is multiplexed:

On February 2, 2016, KRQE added GetTV, a channel that features classic movies from the 1930s to 1960s from Sony Pictures Entertainment, as a subchannel. GetTV was previously shown locally on KUPT-LD channel 16.2 since Fall 2014. GetTV moved to KASY-TV channel 50.3 on January 14, 2017, to make way for Fox programming on January 18. On December 27, 2017, KRQE added Bounce TV on 13.3 as part of Nexstar's overall network deal with Katz Broadcasting that saw their networks spread throughout KRQE, KWBQ and KASY in the market.

Analog-to-digital conversion
KRQE shut down its analog signal, over VHF channel 13, on June 12, 2009, the official date in which full-power television stations in the United States transitioned from analog to digital broadcasts under federal mandate. The station's digital signal relocated from its pre-transition UHF channel 16 to VHF channel 13.

ATSC 3.0 and 4K TV
The station website has announced that on December 13, 2022, KRQE "will be preparing for the arrival of 4K TV". However few details have been given as to where the broadcast will be available other than asking viewers to re-scan their TVs to continue to receive some channels in ATSC 1.0. Although KOAT has filed a notification that it will also be available in ATSC 3.0 on the same date with KASY-TV as the host station.

Satellite stations
These stations rebroadcast KRQE's signal and add local content for other parts of the broadcast market:

Note:
1 KREZ was independent station KJFL-TV from 1963 until going dark on March 2, 1964; it returned to the air September 9, 1965, as KREZ-TV, a satellite station of KREX-TV in Grand Junction, Colorado, and remained as such until February 28, 1995. LIN was in the process of selling KREZ to Native American Broadcasting, LLC. The Federal Communications Commission (FCC) approved the sale in late May 2011, but Native American Broadcasting never closed on the purchase and the station remains with Nexstar . Nexstar's buyout of Media General reunited KREZ with KREX.

Translators

In addition, there are several low-powered repeaters that carry KRQE's programming throughout New Mexico, including the following:

References

External links

Fox New Mexico website

CBS network affiliates
Fox network affiliates
Bounce TV affiliates
Television channels and stations established in 1953
RQE
Mass media in Albuquerque, New Mexico
1953 establishments in New Mexico
Nexstar Media Group